The 1896 Virginia Orange and Bluefootball team represented the University of Virginia as an independent during the 1896 college football season. Led by first-year coach Martin V. Bergen, the team went 7–2–2 and claims a Southern championship. W. A. Martin played at end.

Schedule

Season summary

Week 5: at Princeton
The Princeton Tigers defeated Virginia, 48 to 0; "the game was too one-sided to be interesting."

References

Virginia
Virginia Cavaliers football seasons
Virginia Orange and Blue football